Ben Lamb (born 24 January 1989) is an English actor, best known for his portrayal of Anthony Rivers in The White Queen, Edward in Divergent, Owen Case in Now You See Me 2, and King Richard in A Christmas Prince, A Christmas Prince: The Royal Wedding and A Christmas Prince: The Royal Baby.

Education 
Born in Exeter, Devon, Lamb was educated at Dragon School, Oxford, and Eton College in Berkshire, where he was a music scholar.

Career 
After graduating RADA in 2010, Lamb started his professional career in opera before joining the National Youth Theatre and performed in 20 Cigarettes.

In 2012, Lamb appeared as Percy Bysshe Shelley in Helen Edmundson's play Mary Shelley. In 2013, he appeared as John Willoughby in Edmundson's adaptation of Sense and Sensibility on BBC Radio 4.

In 2013 he starred as Anthony in The White Queen and, in 2014, as Edward in Divergent.

Alongside his film career, he has performed in theatre, playing Lorenzo in The Merchant of Venice at Shakespeare's Globe, alongside Jonathan Pryce, and Malcolm in the Young Vic's Macbeth.

In 2017, he was cast as the title role in Netflix's A Christmas Prince and in the upcoming Swords & Sceptres. Ben reprised his role as Prince Richard in the sequels, A Christmas Prince: The Royal Wedding and A Christmas Prince: The Royal Baby.

Filmography

Film

Television

References

1989 births
21st-century English male actors
Living people
English male film actors
English male stage actors